Vasile Sfetcu (10 May 1937 - 16 September 2016) was a Romanian football goalkeeper and manager.

Club career
Vasile Sfetcu was born on 10 May 1937 in Ploiești, Romania, starting to play football at junior level in 1951 at local club, Metalul, afterwards going to play for Petrolul Ploiești where he made his Divizia A debut on 24 November 1954 in a 3–1 away loss against Metalul Hunedoara. He went to play one season for Metalul 1 Mai Ploiești in Divizia B, afterwards he returned at Petrolul where in the first two seasons he won two consecutive Divizia A titles in 1957–58 and 1958–59, being used by coach Ilie Oană in 17 matches in the first one and in 20 in the second one. Sfetcu was used as a starter by Oană for The Yellow Wolves in the 6–1 victory against Siderurgistul Galați from the 1963 Cupa României Final until he was replaced by Mihai Ionescu in the 85th minute and won another Divizia A title with the team in the 1965–66 season, being used by coach Constantin Cernăianu in 5 games. He made his last Divizia A appearance on 26 March 1969 in a 2–0 away loss against UTA Arad, having a total of 161 appearances in the competition, also he has a total of 16 matches in Cupa României and 14 matches in European competitions (including 7 games in the Inter-Cities Fairs Cup). After three more seasons spent at Metalul Plopeni in the Romanian lower leagues, Sfetcu retired from his playing career and started his coaching career at the junior teams of Petrolul and other clubs from the county, afterwards he settled in Constanța, where he trained several other teams from the area: IMU Medgidia, Șoimii Cernavodă and CFR Constanța. Vasile Sfetcu died on 16 September 2016 in Constanța at age 79.

International career
Vasile Sfetcu played three games at international level for Romania, making his debut on 30 September 1962 when coach Constantin Teașcă send him on the field in the 80th minute in order to replace Gheorghe Dungu in a friendly which ended with a 4–0 victory against Morocco. His second game was a 6–0 away loss against Spain at the 1964 European Nations' Cup qualifiers and his last appearance was also a friendly against Morocco which took place on 23 December 1962 and it ended with a 3–1 away loss, coach Silviu Ploeșteanu sending him on the field in the 40th minute in order to replace Ion Voinescu.

Honours

Player
Petrolul Ploiești
Divizia A: 1957–58, 1958–59, 1965–66
Cupa României: 1962–63
Metalul Plopeni
Divizia C: 1970–71

Notes

References

External links

Vasile Sfetcu at Labtof.ro

1937 births
2016 deaths
Romanian footballers
Romania international footballers
Association football goalkeepers
Liga I players
Liga II players
CSO Plopeni players
FC Petrolul Ploiești players
Romanian football managers
Sportspeople from Ploiești